Folkner Branch is a  long 1st order tributary to the New Hope River in North Carolina.  Folkner Branch joins the New Hope River within the B. Everett Jordan Lake Reservoir.

Course
Folkner Branch rises in a pond on the Rocky Ford and Lick Branch divide about 3 miles west of Green Level, North Carolina.  Folkner Branch then flows westerly to meet New Hope River in the B. Everett Jordan Lake Reservoir in Chatham County.

Watershed
Folkner Branch drains  of area, receives about 47.0 in/year of precipitation, has a topographic wetness index of 508.03, and has an average water temperature of 15.35 °C.  The watershed is 66% forested.

References

Rivers of North Carolina
Rivers of Chatham County, North Carolina